In mathematics, the range of a function may refer to either of two closely related concepts:

 The codomain of the function
 The image of the function

Terminology
As the term "range" can have different meanings, it is considered a good practice to define it the first time it is used in a textbook or article. Older books, when they use the word "range", tend to use it to mean what is now called the codomain.  More modern books, if they use the word "range" at all, generally use it to mean what is now called the image.  To avoid any confusion, a number of modern books don't use the word "range" at all.

Elaboration and example
Given a function

The image of a function is always a subset of the codomain of the function.

As an example of the two different usages, consider the function  as it is used in real analysis (that is, as a function that inputs a real number and outputs its square). In this case, its codomain is the set of real numbers , but its image is the set of non-negative real numbers , since  is never negative if  is real.

In many cases, the image and the codomain can coincide. For example, consider the function , which inputs a real number and outputs its double.  For this function, the codomain and the image are the same (both being the set of real numbers), so the word range is unambiguous.

See also
 Bijection, injection and surjection
 Essential range

Notes and References

Bibliography

Functions and mappings
Basic concepts in set theory